Struthers High School is a public high school in Struthers, Ohio, United States.  It is the only secondary school in the Struthers City School District. Athletic teams compete as the Struthers Wildcats in the Ohio High School Athletic Association  as a member of the Northeast 8 Athletic Conference.

According to the U.S. News & World Report, in 2016 Struthers High School was ranked 137th within Ohio and 2482nd Nationally. The school has a College Readiness Score of 22.4/100.0, with an Advanced Placement participation rate of 34% and Subject Proficiencies of 97% in English and 94% in Mathematics.

OHSAA State Championships
 Girls Basketball – 1978

Notable alumni
Andy Kosco, former Major League Baseball player

See also
 WKTL
 Struthers Fieldhouse

References

External links
Struthers High School
Struthers City School District

High schools in Mahoning County, Ohio
Public high schools in Ohio
Struthers, Ohio